Big Vin Records was an American record label based in Arlington, Texas. The company was formed in February 2006 by former Pantera, Damageplan and Hellyeah drummer Vinnie Paul Abbott and had a distribution deal with Fontana Records, which in turn is owned by Universal Music Group.

Abbott started the label a year after the on-stage murder of his brother, Dimebag Darrell, on December 8, 2004.

Seventh Void, the Hillbilly Orchestra, Fountainhead, and Mark "The Chinaman" Britten are among the artists signed to the label.

Releases

Albums
Rebel Meets Rebel by David Allan Coe and Cowboys from Hell (2006)
Heaven Is Gone by Seventh Void (2009)
Underkill by Fountainhead (2015)

DVDs
Dimevision, Volume 1 (2006)

Abbott stated that he planned to preserve his brother's legacy and continue to release his recorded material. DimeVision Vol. 2, along with an official photo book for Dimebag, was released in 2017, substantially delayed from its initial planned release date of 2008.

Artists
Hillbilly Orchestra
Seventh Void
Mark "The Chinaman" Britten

References

External links
Big Vin Records official website
Dimevision official website
Rebel Meets Rebel official website
Hillbilly Orchestra official website
Big Vin Records' official MySpace page

American record labels
Record labels established in 2006
Heavy metal record labels